Mohinder Singh Rai (15 March 1934 – 26 May 2002) was an Indian triple jumper born in village Khan Khana Punjab who competed in the 1956 Summer Olympics.

References

1934 births
2002 deaths
Indian male triple jumpers
Olympic athletes of India
Athletes (track and field) at the 1956 Summer Olympics
Asian Games medalists in athletics (track and field)
Athletes (track and field) at the 1958 Asian Games
Commonwealth Games competitors for India
Athletes (track and field) at the 1958 British Empire and Commonwealth Games
Medalists at the 1958 Asian Games
Asian Games gold medalists for India